Alice Adams is a 1935 romantic drama film directed by George Stevens and starring Katharine Hepburn. It was made by RKO and produced by Pandro S. Berman. The screenplay was by Dorothy Yost, Mortimer Offner, and Jane Murfin. The film was adapted from the novel Alice Adams by Booth Tarkington. The music score was by Max Steiner and Roy Webb, and the cinematography by Robert De Grasse. The film received Academy Award nominations for Best Picture and Best Actress.

The film is about a young woman in a financially-struggling family and her pretentious attempts to appear upper class and to wed a wealthy man while she conceals her poverty. Hepburn's popularity had declined after her two 1933 film triumphs: her Oscar-winning performance in  Morning Glory and her celebrated performance as Jo March in Little Women. Her performance in Alice Adams made her a public favorite again.

Plot

Alice Adams (Katharine Hepburn) is the daughter of the Adams family. Her father, (Fred Stone), is an invalid employed as a clerk in a factory owned by Mr. Lamb (Charles Grapewin), who has kept Adams on salary for years despite his lengthy illness. Her mother, (Ann Shoemaker), is embittered by her husband's lack of ambition and upset by the snubs endured by her daughter because of their poverty. Alice's older brother Walter (Frank Albertson) is a gambler who cannot hold a job and associates with African Americans, which, given the time period in which the film is set, is considered a major social embarrassment.

As the film begins, Alice attends a dance given by the wealthy Mildred Palmer (Evelyn Venable). She has no date, and she is escorted to the occasion by Walter. Alice, a social climber like her mother, engages in socially-inappropriate behavior and conversation in an attempt to impress others. At the dance, Alice meets wealthy Arthur Russell (Fred MacMurray), who is charmed by her despite her poverty.

Alice's mother nags her husband into quitting his job and pouring his life savings into a glue factory. Mr. Lamb ostracizes Mr. Adams from society in the belief that Adams stole the glue formula from him. Alice is the subject of cruel town gossip, which Russell ignores.

Alice invites Russell to the Adams home for a fancy meal. She and her mother put on airs, the entire family dresses inappropriately in formal wear despite the hot summer night, and the Adamses pretend that they eat caviar and fancy rich-tasting food all the time. The dinner is ruined by Alice's inability to keep up the lie, but she blames the situation on the supposed slovenly behavior and poor cooking skills of Malena (Hattie McDaniel), the maid hired by the Adamses for the occasion. Mr. Adams unwittingly embarrasses Alice by exposing the many lies she has told Russell. When Walter shows up with bad financial news, Alice gently expels Russell from the house now that everything is "ruined."

Walter claims that "a friend of mine got in a jam," and to help his friend, Walter has stolen $150 from Mr. Lamb. (The obvious implication is that Walter stole the money to pay off his own gambling debts.) Mr. Adams decides to take a loan against his new factory to save Walter from jail.

Just then, Mr. Lamb appears at the Adams house, accuses Adams of stealing the glue formula from him, and declares his intention to ruin Adams by building a glue factory directly across the street from the Adams plant. The men argue violently, but their friendship is saved when Alice confesses that her parents took the glue formula only so that she could have a better life and some social status. Lamb and Adams reconcile, and Lamb indicates that he will not prosecute Walter.

Alice wanders onto the porch, where Russell has been waiting for her. He confesses his love for her despite her poverty and family problems.

Cast

Academy Award nominations
The film was nominated for the Oscar for Best Picture, and Hepburn for Best Actress. Although Bette Davis won the award for her performance in Dangerous, she said that Hepburn deserved the award, and Hepburn ended up receiving the second-most votes.

Production
The 1935 film of Alice Adams is the second adaptation of the Tarkington novel. A silent film version had been made in 1923, directed by Rowland V. Lee.

Katharine Hepburn wanted George Cukor to direct the film, but Cukor was engaged in directing David Copperfield. Cukor advised her to choose William Wyler or George Stevens as director. Although Hepburn favored the German-born and Swiss-educated Wyler, the producer Pandro S. Berman favored the American George Stevens.

The plot of the film differs from the book Alice Adams in significant ways. Most importantly, the novel depicts Alice as permanently estranged from Russell. The original script by Dorothy Yost and Jane Murfin ended with Alice and Russell in love, but Stevens was so unhappy with the script and the ending that he, his friend Mortimer Offner, and Hepburn discarded most of it and rewrote it by using dialogue taken from the novel. Their script ended with Alice's relationship with Russell up in the air, and it finished with a scene in which Alice goes to secretarial school.

However, Berman and RKO executives wanted a happy ending in which Alice gets Russell. Stevens and Hepburn opposed the change. Berman enlisted the aid of Cukor, who agreed that the more realistic ending would be box-office poison and so the script was changed into allowing Russell to fall in love with Alice and to win her over.

Reception
After the cinema circuits deducted their exhibition percentage of box office ticket sales, the film made a profit of $164,000.

Critical reviews 
In a retrospective review, Pauline Kael deemed the film "a classic" and stated that "Hepburn gives one of her two or three finest performances".

References

Bibliography

Further reading
 Tibbetts, John C., And James M, Welsh, eds. The Encyclopedia of Novels Into Film (2005) pp. 8–9.

External links

 
 
 
 
 

1930s historical romance films
1935 romantic drama films
RKO Pictures films
1935 films
American black-and-white films
Films based on American novels
Films directed by George Stevens
Films based on works by Booth Tarkington
American romantic drama films
Films with screenplays by Dorothy Yost
Films with screenplays by Jane Murfin
American historical romance films
1930s English-language films
1930s American films